Katie Nicole Mitchell is an American lawyer and jurist serving as a magistrate judge of the United States District Court for the Eastern District of Texas.

Early life and education
Mitchell was born and raised in Victoria, Texas, and graduated from St. Joseph High School, participating in 4-H while growing up and receiving a 4-H scholarship. Mitchell earned a Bachelor of Arts degree in psychology and a Master of Arts degree in student affairs administration in higher education from Texas A&M University. At Texas A&M, Mitchell served as a director of the Aggie Orientation Leader Program that helped over 10,000 new students transition to the university.

Mitchell then received her Juris Doctor from Baylor Law School in 2006, where she graduated sixth in her class, served as senior executive editor of the Baylor Law Review, and was active on various moot court and mock trial teams.

Career
In 2001, after receiving her master's degree, Baylor University hired Mitchell as its first coordinator of New Student Programs as part of its "Baylor 2012" vision.

After graduating from law school, Mitchell served as a judicial law clerk for Judge Leonard Davis from 2006 to 2007. After clerking for Judge Davis, Mitchell joined the Houston office of the law firm Fulbright & Jaworski, working primarily in the healthcare litigation and health law litigation sections, in addition to patent litigation and patent prosecution as a registered patent attorney before the United States Patent and Trademark Office. After working for three years at Fulbright, Mitchell returned to the chambers of Judge Leonard Davis and served as his chief staff attorney.

Mitchell was sworn in as a U.S. magistrate judge on August 16, 2013. Mitchell has heard numerous patent cases and also serves as a volunteer mediator with the United States Court of Appeals for the Federal Circuit.

References

External links
The Honorable K. Nicole Mitchell, United States District Court for the Eastern District of Texas
Law360 Q&A with Judge Mitchell
Baylor Law School News: Nicole Mitchell (JD '06) appointed U.S. Magistrate Judge for the Eastern District of Texas
Victoria Advocate – At 35, St. Joseph High alumna becomes federal judge
Eastern District of Texas – K. Nicole Mitchell Biography

1970s births
Living people
21st-century American judges
21st-century American women judges
American women lawyers
Baylor Law School alumni
People from Tyler, Texas
People from Victoria, Texas
Texas A&M University alumni
United States magistrate judges
Year of birth missing (living people)